Un'altra direzione (English: Another Direction) is the tenth studio album by Italian singer-songwriter Nek released on 30 January 2009. Nuevas direcciones (English: New Directions) is the Spanish-language edition of the album, released on 14 April 2009.

The album topped the Italian Albums Chart, and was certified platinum by the FIMI for sales exceeding 70,000 copies in Italy.

Composition
The album is musically pop rock with some other influences, like reggae on "Le mie mani", electronica on "Un'ora in più", as well country. It is considered as his most mature album up to that point in career, which lyrics, beside the love stories, show other themes like dependence on material goods ("Perdere il controllo"), difficulties encountered in everyday life ("Nel giorno che verrà") and marginalization ("Tira su il volume").

The lyrics of "Se non ami" were written after Nek read the 1 Corinthians 13, in Italian known as "Inno alla carità", credited by Paul the Apostle. The lyrics of "Per non morire mai" were inspired by a poem of Martha Medeiros, Muere lentamente. The song "Quante cose sei" is dedicated to Nek's wife.

Release
The Italian-language album was released in standard edition with twelve tracks and bonus track "Walking Away" (a duet with Craig David), and special edition with only six tracks and reduced price due to crisis.

The first single "La voglia che non vorrei" was released on 9 January 2009, and its video was directed by Marco Salom. In the video the clashes between the players in the mud of rugby field were a metaphor of our life path fraught with difficulties and setbacks.

Tour
Nek held a nationwide tour with over 16 concerts between March and May in 2009.

Reception

The album has generally met with positive reviews. Alexey Eremenko from Allmusic gave the album 3.5/5 stars, noted that "the music is simply energetic enough -- the guitars may not be big enough for classic power pop", however Nek "knows just how to handle the music". In the best part it's like Bryan Adams, even Goo Goo Dolls, and it "packs copious amounts of minor-key melodies to create the romantic mood that Italian pop is primarily known for, with a twist of an innocently sleazy nighttime melodrama that is prime Ramazzotti. But Nek is clever enough to never overdo the dramatizing, and packs the tunes with enough simple but effective hooks to give the album the charm of a guilty pleasure done right".

Track listing

Un'altra direzione

Nuevas direcciones

Personnel

Music
Arranger: F. Neviani, Dado Parisini
Producers: Dado Parisini, Alfredo Cerruti (also executive), Nek
Production Assistant: Serena Baer
Recording&Mixing: Jon Jacobs, Gabriele Gigli, Matteo Bolzoni (1, 2, 3, 5, 6, 7, 8, 12) at Logic Studio in Milan 
Recording&Mixing: Claudio Morselli, Jon Jacobs, Carlo Alberto Pinna, Giuseppe Salvadori (4, 9, 10, 11) at Esagono Studio in Rubeira
Mastering: Antonio Baglio at Nautilus Studio in Milan

Cover art
Photographer: Aaron Baghetti
Artist: Sara Ferraris, Studioprodesign

Musicians
 Nek - vocals, acoustic guitar, keyboards, drums, dobro, percussions, electric guitar, backing vocals
 Paolo Costa - bass
 Emiliano Fantuzzi - electric guitar, keyboards
 Luciano Galloni - drums
 Max Costa - keyboards, programming
 Cesare Chiodo - programming
 Alfredo Golino - drums
 Dado Parisini - keyboards, piano, strings
 Massimo Varini - acoustic guitar, backing vocals, electric guitar

Charts
Album

Year-end

References

2009 albums
Nek albums